The Greek ambassador in Washington, D.C. is the official representative of the Hellenic Republic Government to the Government of the United States.

History 
After the War of Independence, which started in 1821, Greece was declared an independent state but it was not until February 3, 1830 that the Independence was recognized by the Great Powers with the signing of the Protocol of London. On May 7, 1832 Otto of Greece arrived in Nafplion and Greece became a Kingdom. The United States, however, only recognized the Greek state in 1833. In December 1837 a commercial treaty was signed, which regulated trade between the two countries. The first Greek consulate to be established was New Orleans in 1866 with Nicolas Benachi as the first Greek consul there. In 1867, Demetrios Nicholas Botassis was named Consul General of Greece in New York City.

Ambassadors 
List of Chiefs of protocol:

 December 23, 1907 Lambros Koromilas, Minister Resident
 July 29, 1909 Lambros Koromilas
 March 13, 1913 A. Vouros, Charge d'Affaires
 August 17, 1914 Agamemnon Schliemann
 December 7, 1914 A. Vouros, Charge d’Affaires a.i.

 September 21, 1917 
 October 25, 1920 Georgios Drakopoulos, in charge of Legation
 December 15, 1920 Georgios Drakopoulos Charge d’Affaires a.i.
 January 11, 1923 , Charge d’Affaires a.i.
 May 22, 1924 , Charge d'Affaires a.i.
 June 30, 1924 Vasilios Mammonos, Charge d'Affaires a.i.
 August 21, 1924 Konstantinos D. Xanthopoulos, Charge d’Affaires a.i.
 December 12, 1924 Charalambos Simopoulos
 April 26, 1935 Dimitrios Sikelianos
 February 7, 1940 

Legation raised to Embassy
 October 6, 1942 
 December 6, 1946 Pavlos Oikonomou-Gouras, Charge d'Affaires a.i.
 June 3, 1947 
 December 8, 1954 Athanase George Politis
 October 6, 1958 
 February 13, 1962 Alexandros Matsas
 September 20, 1967 
 November 13, 1969 Basil Vitsaksis
 December 1, 1972 Ioannis Argyrios Sorokos
 February 27, 1974 
 September 3, 1974 
 August 16, 1979 , Charge d’Affaires ad interim
 September 4, 1979 
 December 15, 1981 Georgios Sioris, Charge d’Affaires ad interim
 January 13, 1982 Nikolaos Karandreas
 September 10, 1983 Georgios Sioris, Charge d'Affaires ad interim
 September 19, 1983 Georgios Papoulias
 September 21, 1989 
 June 15, 1993 
 July 6, 1998 Alexander Philon
 July 2, 2002 Georgios Savvaidis
 October 3, 2005 Alexandros Mallias
 July 20, 2009 Vassilis Kaskarelis
 September 19, 2012 Christos Panagopoulos
 June 2016 Haris Lalacos
 February 2020 Alexandra Papadopoulou

See also 
 Greece–United States relations
 List of ambassadors of the United States to Greece

References 

 
United States
Greece